Bishun Narain Khare (27 June 1933 – 20 August 2013) was a scientist who specialized in the chemistry of planetary atmospheres and of molecules relevant to biology. He published several papers on tholins, the organic molecules formed by ultraviolet radiation or cosmic rays.  From 1968 to 1996, Khare worked in Carl Sagan's Laboratory for Planetary Studies at Cornell University. During this time he appeared in the Cosmos television series. From 1996 to 1998, he worked at the NASA Ames Research Center and from 1998 onward he worked at the SETI Institute. 

After his death, the International Astronomical Union named a crater on Pluto after him called the Khare Crater.

Publications

References/ External links
Profile on SETI
Memorial Page on SETI

1933 births
2013 deaths
20th-century Indian astronomers
Indian astrophysicists
Astrochemists
Planetary scientists
Scientists from Varanasi